Antoine Alphonse Chassepot (1833–1905) was a French inventor and gunsmith. Born in 1833 in the town of Mutzig in Alsace, he is best known for inventing the breech-loading, center-fire needle gun rifle named after him: the Chassepot. Officially known as the Fusil modèle 1866, the rifle was adopted by the French army in 1866, for which Chassepot received the Cross of the Légion d'honneur and a gratuity of 30,000 francs.

References

1833 births
1905 deaths
19th-century French inventors
19th-century French engineers
Firearm designers